Mac King (born December 2, 1959) is an American magician who has performed on television specials, often as a co-host. He has his own family-friendly show, "The Mac King Comedy Magic Show", at the Excalibur Hotel and Casino in the Thunderland Showroom, in Las Vegas, Nevada. King's show is currently the longest running one-man show in the history of Las Vegas.

Career
After college graduation King began touring the comedy clubs with his one-man comedy magic act. Over the next nineteen years his career took off, to such an extent that for years he did over 200 shows a year.

In the nineties he began to do television specials, and to appear at Las Vegas casinos.

In January 2000, King became a permanent act at Harrah's, performing 10 shows a week.

In addition to the TV specials and Harrah's performances, King performs at more than 60 private corporate events each year. Some of his better-known effects involve goldfish, Fig Newtons, and a yellow raincoat he claims is a magic cloak of invisibility.

On June 4, 2021, it was announced Mac King will move from Harrah's Las Vegas after 20 years to Excalibur.

On-stage accident
One of King's most memorable moments occurred while performing his cut-and-restored rope routine. King has said that one of his biggest pet peeves is that some magicians use dull scissors, and he makes it a point to keep his scissors razor sharp. While performing the routine, he accidentally severed the tip of his thumb. He quickly tried to stop the bleeding by wrapping his thumb in tape, but the injury was too severe. He asked the audience if there was a nurse present, and a nurse stepped forward. She managed to stop the bleeding. King continued with his show and finished his second show later that evening before going to the hospital to have his injury treated.

Television shows and specials 

On the NBC The World's Greatest Magic specials, King taught the audience a minor effect before and after each commercial in segments referred to as the Mac King School of Magic. He is the only magician to be in all five of the network's specials.

 An Evening at the Improv
 Comic Strip Live
 The World's Greatest Magic
 The World's Greatest Magic II
 The World's Greatest Magic III
 The World's Greatest Magic IV
 The World's Greatest Magic V
 Houdini: Unlocking His Secrets
 The World's Wildest Magic
 Penn and Teller's Sin City Spectacular
 Donny and Marie
 The Other Half
 Penn & Teller: Fool Us

King's home was also featured on HGTV.

Personal life
King was born December 2, 1959 in Hopkinsville, Kentucky. He became interested in magic as a kid because both of his grandfathers (Elwood Huffman and Pax King) were keen amateur magicians. King was a graduate from the J. Graham Brown School in Louisville, Kentucky in 1977. King then attended Macalester College in Saint Paul, Minnesota, on a National Merit Scholarship. He graduated with Highest Honors in 1981 with a double major (Anthropology and Magic).

King performed, with fellow Kentuckian Lance Burton, over the summers he had off during college. 
They did three shows a day, every day, at a western-themed park in Cumberland Falls, Kentucky.

King married Jennifer Sils in 1985, having met her when she was chosen from the audience by King to help with a trick. They have one child named Eli King who was born in Nevada.

He is also friends with Penn & Teller, who wrote the preface to King's book Tricks With Your Head.

In March 2022, King eulogized The Amazing Johnathan, who had died a couple of weeks prior.

Books
King has co-authored 3 books.
 Tricks With Your Head, a humorously-written series of tricks mostly requiring few, if any props (other than the performer's anatomy), co-authored with Mark Levy.
 Campfire Magic subtitled "Over 50 Amazing and Easy-to-Learn Tricks and Mind-Blowing Stunts" co-authored with Bill King.
 Great Big Ol' Book-o-Magic.

King also collaborated with cartoonist Jeff Knurek to create and market the "Magic in a Minute" line of children's promotions, toys, magic tricks, videos, books, and events.

References

External links 
King's official Page
Las Vegas Online: Review of his show
Press Kit and Bio Information

American magicians
1959 births
Living people
People from Hopkinsville, Kentucky
Macalester College alumni
People from Louisville, Kentucky
J. Graham Brown School alumni
Las Vegas shows
Academy of Magical Arts Magician of the Year winners